Paul Housberg (born January 31, 1953) is an American glass artist recognized for his use of fused and kiln formed glass as an architectural medium. He currently resides in Jamestown, Rhode Island.

Education and early career
Housberg received his Bachelor of Fine Arts (1975) and Master of Fine Arts (1979) degrees from Rhode Island School of Design where he has also served as an instructor at various times during 1978-1997.

While he was at RISD, Housberg studied glass under artist Dale Chihuly and in 1972, a year after it was founded, he studied at the Pilchuck Glass School in Stanwood, Washington.

Early in his career, Housberg studied painting, but was drawn to glass for its atmospheric color. He began working in stained glass but eventually moved to work in kiln formed glass as an alternative to the lead structure of traditional stained glass.

After his graduate work at RISD, he studied in England with Patrick Reyntiens, a pioneer in contemporary stained glass and the author of The Technique of Stained Glass. This experience was made possible by a scholarship he received from the New York Experimental Glass Workshop, now known as Urban Glass in Brooklyn, New York.

In 1986, as a Fulbright Scholar, Housberg worked at the International Center for Glass Research (CIRVA) in Marseille, France. He spent his time exploring various glass techniques such as fusing, slumping, and kiln-casting. This endeavor was supported in part by a donation of glass from Bullseye Glass in Portland, Oregon, a pioneer in the manufacturing of fusible glass.

Work
Housberg is noted for his inventive applications of glassworking technologies in architectural settings. Central to his work are the tactile qualities of glass and the expression of its materiality.

Although Housberg continues to explore and implement multiple techniques in his work, he is best known for his architectural installations consisting of colorful kilnformed tiles with a sawtooth relief.

Housberg's work was profiled in the multimedia documentary series, NetWorks Rhode Island, in 2016.

Architectural installations
Housberg’s first large architectural commission was in 1990 from The Dreyfus Corporation for the MetLife Building in New York City. This work was done with the architecture firm Swanke Hayden Connell Ltd. of New York and incorporated cast glass fabricated in conjunction with Fenton Art Glass. The 8'h x 21'w wall is of Dreyfus's iconic lion, standing in tall grass.

His second major commission was in 1993 for Pfizer Inc in Groton, CT where he worked with the architectural firm CUH2A Inc., Princeton, NJ. The work was for four 12’h x 11’w walls, each depicting a season. Four Seasons is made of cast and laminated glass.

His third major installation was completed in 1999 at the William J. Nealon Federal Building and U.S. Courthouse Annex in Scranton, PA designed by Bohlin Cywinski Jackson, Wilkes-Barre, PA. This 14’h x 40’w work was commissioned by the U.S. General Services Administration Art in Architecture Program.

In 2001, Housberg completed his first installation to use his signature sawtooth glass tiles. The 12’h x 9’w backlit, kilnformed glass wall is in the lobby of The Peninsula Chicago.

In 2009, Housberg completed a large installation at the California State Teachers’ Retirement System (CalSTRS)
building designed by HOK San Francisco. This particular work was fabricated in collaboration with Derix Glass Studio and Lamberts Glas. The piece features tiles composed of handblown glass treated with vitreous enamels and laminated to mirror. The tiles are mounted to four walls in the lobby.

In 2010, Housberg completed a public art series in Rhode Island at the Governor Philip W. Noel Judicial Complex.

Select public art commissions
 The Governor Philip W. Noel Judicial Complex Warwick, RI, 2010. Architect: HOK, NY

 Naugatuck Valley Community College Waterbury, CT, 2008. Architect: Amenta/Emma Architects
 University of Utah Marriott Library Salt Lake City, UT, 2008. Interior Architect: MJSAA Architects 
 Logan International Gateway Massachusetts Port Authority, 2007. Architect: Skidmore, Owings & Merrill, LLP 
 Tooele Third District Court Utah Arts Council, 2007. Architect: MHTN Architects
 William J. Nealon Federal Building and U.S. Courthouse, Scranton, PA, 1999. Architect: Bohlin Cywinski Jackson

 
 Alpenglow Elementary School Eagle River, AK, Percent for Art, 1995
 Montgomery County Government Art in Public Architecture, Bethesda, MD, Little Falls Community Library, 1991

Select private installations
 Water Walk, Spaulding Rehabilitation Hospital Boston, MA, 2013. Architect: Perkins+Will

 Frick Chemistry Lab, Princeton University Princeton, NJ, 2010. Architect: Hopkins Architects, London in collaboration with Payette Associates, Boston

 The New York Helmsley Hotel New York, NY, 2010. Designer: J/Brice International
 California State Teachers’ Retirement System (CalSTRS) Sacramento, CA, 2009. Architect: HOK

 Silver Towers New York City, NY, 2009. Architect: Costas Kondylis and Partners
 Women & Infants Hospital Providence, RI, 2009. Architect: Anshen + Allen
 Florida Hospital Orlando, FL, 2008. Architect: Hunton Brady Architects
 Ink 48 Hotel New York, NY, 2008. Interior Architect: Rockwell Group
 Radisson Lexington New York, NY, 2007. Designer: Stonehill and Taylor
 Children’s Specialized Hospital New Brunswick, NJ, 2007. Architect: HKS; Interior Architect: Granary Associates
 GTECH Providence, RI, 2006. Architect: Spagnolo Gisness & Associates 
 California Pacific Medical Center San Francisco, CA, 2005. Architect: SMWM
 Ernst & Young Boston, MA, 2005. Architect: Gensler
 Geoffrey & Keenie Fieger residence Bloomfield Hills, MI 2004
 St. Regis Resort Aspen, CO, 2004
 Marriott Hotel Richmond, VA, 2003
 Temple Habonim Barrington, RI, 2003
 Graves 601 Hotel, Minneapolis, MN, 2003. Designer: Yabu Pushelberg
 The Peninsula Hotel Chicago, IL, 2001. Designer: BAMO
 Integrative Center for Health Pawtucket, RI, 2000
 Pfizer Inc. Groton, CT, 1993. Architect: CUH2A Inc
 The Dreyfus Corporation New York, NY, 1990. Architect: Swanke Hayden Connell Ltd.

Publications
Housberg’s work has been published in The New Glass Review and in the book Luxury Hotels America By Martin Nicholas Kunz, Patrice Farameh, Patricia Massó.

His work was also featured in Stephen Knapp’s The Art of Glass: Integrating Architecture and Glass

References

External links

Rhode Island State Council on the Arts

 as part of NetWorks Rhode Island

American glass artists
Artists from New York City
Rhode Island School of Design faculty
Artists from Rhode Island
American stained glass artists and manufacturers
Rhode Island School of Design alumni
1953 births
Living people
People from Jamestown, Rhode Island